The Aérospatiale Alouette III (Lark; company designations SA 316 and SA 319) is a single-engine, light utility helicopter developed by French aircraft company Sud Aviation. During its production life, it proved to be a relatively popular rotorcraft; including multiple licensed manufacturers, more than 2,000 units were built.

The Alouette III was developed as an enlarged derivative of the earlier and highly successful Alouette II. Sharing many elements with its predecessor while offering an extra pair of seats and other refinements, it quickly became a commercial success amongst both civil and military customers. Further variants were also developed; amongst these was a high-altitude derivative, designated as the SA 315B Lama, which entered operational service during July 1971. The Alouette III was principally manufactured by Aérospatiale; the type was also built under licence by Hindustan Aeronautics Limited (HAL) in India as the HAL Chetak, by Industria Aeronautică Română (IAR) in Romania as the IAR 316 and F+W Emmen in Switzerland.

Similar to the Alouette II, in military service, it was used to perform missions such as aerial observation, photography, air-sea rescue, liaison, transport and training; it could also be armed with anti-tank missiles, anti-shipping torpedoes, and a fixed cannon. In a civilian capacity, the Alouette III was commonly used for casualty evacuation (often fitted with a pair of external stretcher panniers), crop-spraying, personnel transportation, and for carrying external loads. By the 2010s, many operators were in the process of drawing down their fleets and replacing them with more modern types; the French military intend to replace their Alouette IIIs with the newly developed Airbus Helicopters H160.

Development

Origins
The Alouette III has its origins with an earlier helicopter design by French aircraft manufacturer Sud-Est, the SE 3120 Alouette, which, while breaking several helicopter speed and distance records in July 1953, was deemed to have been too complex to be realistic commercial product. Having received financial backing from the French government, which had taken an official interest in the venture, the earlier design was used as a starting point for a new rotorcraft that would harness the newly developed turboshaft engine; only a few years prior, Joseph Szydlowski, the founder of Turbomeca, had successfully managed to develop the Artouste, a  single shaft turbine engine derived from his Orédon turbine engine. An improved version of this engine was combined with the revised design to quickly produce a new helicopter, initially known as the SE 3130 Alouette II.

During April 1956, the first production Alouette II was completed, becoming the first production turbine-powered helicopter in the world. The innovative light helicopter soon broke several world records and became a commercial success. As a result of the huge demand for the Alouette II, manufacturer Sud Aviation took a great interest in the development of derivatives, as well as the more general ambition of embarking on further advancement in the field of rotorcraft.

In accordance with these goals, the company decided to commit itself to a new development programme with the aim of developing a more powerful helicopter that would be capable of accommodating up to 7 seats or a pair of stretchers. The design team was managed by French aerospace engineer René Mouille. The design produced, designated as the SE 3160, featured several improvements over the Alouette II; efforts were made to provide for a higher level of external visibility for the pilot as well as for greater aerodynamic efficiency via the adoption of a highly streamlined exterior.

Into flight

On 28 February 1959, the first prototype SE 3160 performed its maiden flight, piloted by French aviator Jean Boulet. Shortly thereafter, the SE 3160 would become more commonly known as the Alouette III. During its flight test programme, the prototype demonstrated its high altitude capabilities on several occasions; in June 1959, it landed at an altitude of over 4,000 metres in the Mont Blanc mountain range and, during October 1960, it was able to achieve the same feat at an altitude more than 6,000 metres in the Himalayas. During these attempts, it was flown by Jean Boulet, who was accompanied by a pair of passengers and 250 kg of equipment.

During 1961, the initial SE 3160 model of the type entered serial production. On 15 December 1961, the Alouette III received its airworthiness certificate, clearing it to enter operational service. Despite an order placed by the French Army for an initial batch of 50 Alouette IIIs during June 1961, the first two customers of the rotorcraft were in fact export sales, having been sold outside of France. The Alouette III was specifically designed to fly at high altitudes, as such, it quickly earned a reputation for its favourable characteristics during rescue operations. According to its manufacturer, it was the first helicopter to present an effective multi-mission capability and performance to match with its diverse mission range in both civil or military circles.

The SE 3160 model continued to be produced until 1968, when it was replaced by the refined SA 316B model. (After its production ended, the SE 3160 has sometimes been retroactively redesignated "SA 316A", but its original SE 3160 designation is more commonly used, especially in older sources.) Both the SE 3160 and the SA 316B were powered by a more powerful version of the Artouste engine, the Artouste IIIB, whose turbine was rated to produce , though because of the limits of the engine's reduction gearbox, the Artouste IIIB was de-rated to generate  in service. The later SA 319B model adopted the more fuel-efficient Turbomeca Astazou XIVB engine, extending its range and endurance; on 10 July 1967, the Astazou-powered Alouette III performed its first flight. During 1979, the last and 1,437th Alouette III departed from the company's assembly line in Marignane, France, after which the main production line was closed down as a consequence of diminishing demand for the type. During 1985, the final Alouette III was delivered.

Overseas production
Despite the closure of Aérospatiale 's own production line, the event was not the end of the type's manufacturing activity. Over 500 Alouette IIIs are recorded as having been manufactured under licence abroad in several countries, such as Romania, India, and Switzerland. Hindustan Aeronautics Limited (HAL) obtained a licence to construct the Alouette III, which was known locally as the HAL Chetak, at their own production facilities in India. More than 300 units were built by HAL; the company has continued to independently update and indigenise the helicopter over the decades. A modernised variant of the Chetak has remained production, though at a diminished volume, into the 21st century. Various versions of the Alouette III were also either licence-built or otherwise assembled by IAR in Romania (as the IAR 316), F+W Emmen (de) in Switzerland, and by Fokker and Lichtwerk in the Netherlands.

By the 2010s, the majority of Alouette III operators were in the process of winding down or entirely retiring their fleets. During 2017, the French Navy observed that it was costing the service around 13,000 Euros per flight hour to operate a single Alouette III, which it claims was more than double the equivalent costs of a modern-day rotorcraft in its class; it attributed this high running cost as being a natural side effect of their fleet's advanced age and an overall shortage of spare parts for the type, which has in turn been caused by the mass production of the Alouette III having been terminated three decades earlier. Furthermore, retirement has also been motived by a lack of modern features that would be present upon contemporary helicopters, which is a natural consequence of the Alouette III having been originally developed during the 1950s.

Operational history

Argentina
The Argentine Naval Aviation operated a total of 14 Alouette III helicopters. A single SA316B was on board the  when she was sunk by torpedoes fired by   during the 1982 Falklands War between Argentina and the United Kingdom. A second Alouette III played an important role during the Argentine Invasion of South Georgia. On 2 December 2010, the last example was retired at a ceremony held at BAN Comandante Espora, Bahía Blanca.

Australia
Between April 1964 and 1967, a small batch of Alouette IIIs were delivered from France in a disassembled state to Australia. Following their assembly, these were used by the Royal Australian Air Force (RAAF) at the Woomera Rocket Range for light passenger transport purpose and to assist in the recovery of missile parts in the aftermath of test launches conducted at the Range.

Austria
Between 1967 and 1969 Austria acquired 12 SE3160 Alouette IIIs which were upgraded to version SE316B.
They are used for liaison and transport purposes and still play a vital role in rescue missions in the high mountains of Austria with their side-mounted hook.
They are stationed in Aigen im Ennstal, Klagenfurt and Schwaz in Tirol. Austria plans to decommission them beginning in 2023.

Bangladesh

Indian civilian authorities and the IAF donated 1 DC-3 Dakota (gifted by the Maharaja of Jodhpor), 1 Twin Otter plane, and 1 Alouette III helicopter for the newborn Bangladesh Air Force, which was to take advantage of the lack of night-fighting capability of the PAF to launch hit-and-run attacks on sensitive targets inside Bangladesh from the air. The Alouette III helicopter was rigged to fire 14 rockets from pylons attached to its side and had .303 Browning machine guns installed, in addition to having 1-inch (25 mm) steel plate welded to its floor for extra protection. Squadron Leader Sultan Mahmood, Flight Lieutenant Bodiul Alam, and Captain Shahabuddin, all of whom later won the Bir Uttam gallantry award, operated the helicopter.

Chile
During 1977, the Chilean Navy ordered a batch of ten SA-319Bs. These rotorcraft, which were delivered by the middle of 1978, were only made operational just before the peak of the Beagle conflict between Chile and neighbouring Argentina. The Alouette III was the first real organic maritime ship borne tactical helicopter to be operated by Chile's naval forces; for this role, they were equipped with a radar and armed with rockets, guns, depth charges and a single light anti-submarine torpedo.

During the frantic training period in 1978 to meet wartime needs, a sole SA-319B was accidentally damaged, leading to it being placed in storage and subsequently repaired back to an airworthy condition years later. All ten Chilean Navy SA-319Bs were operational and in excellent conditions by the end of the 1980s, shortly after which they were replaced by larger SA532 Super Puma helicopters, and were bought by civilian operators.

Denmark
Between 1962 and 1967, a total of 8 Alouette IIIs were delivered to the Royal Danish Navy. They were primarily tasked with SAR and reconnaissance in support of the navy's Arctic patrol ships. During 1982, they were replaced by a batch of British Westland Lynx.

France

During early 1960, the Alouette III officially entered squadron service with the French armed forces. In June 1971, having been suitably impressed by the type's performance so far, the French Army elected to order a force of 50 Alouette IIIs for their own purposes. Amongst the most noteworthy uses that France applied the type to was the first use of helicopter-based anti-tank missiles in the form of the SS.11 MCLOS wire-guided missile.

During June 1960, an Alouette III carrying seven people successfully performed both take-offs and landings on Mont Blanc in the French Alps at an altitude of 4,810 metres (15,780 feet), an unprecedented altitude for such activities by a helicopter at the time. The same helicopter again demonstrated the types extraordinary performance in November 1960 by making take-offs and landings with a crew of two and a payload of 250 kg (551 lbs) in the Himalayas at an altitude of 6,004 metres (19,698 feet).

During June 2004, the Alouette III was retired from the French Air Force after 32 years of successful service, having been entirely replaced by the newer twin-engined Eurocopter EC 355 Ecureuil 2. The French Army also withdrew the last of their examples during 2013 in favour of more modern rotorcraft.

By 2017, the French Navy were still using the Alouette III in a reduced capacity, nonetheless being used to routinely conduct both Search and Rescue and logistics missions. Since the 1970s, the type has gradually been supplanted by the larger Eurocopter AS365 Dauphin, and later on, by the specialised Eurocopter AS565 Panther as an anti-submarine warfare platform. The use of twin-engined rotorcraft in the maritime environment has become somewhat of an expected standard, one which the single-engined Alouette III cannot satisfy, putting the type at an obvious disadvantage. During January 2018, it was announced that the French Navy would be replacing its remaining Alouette IIIs with rented Aérospatiale SA 330 Pumas as a stop-gap measure; this decision was reportedly taken due to its increasing unreliability, rapidly inflating operating costs, and the sheer age of the fleet. However, as of 2021 the Alouette III was still reported to be in service. The aircraft was finally withdrawn from French Navy service in June 2022.

Ireland

During 1963, the first pair of Alouette IIIs were delivered to the Irish Air Corps; a third rotorcraft arrived in 1964 and a batch of five further aircraft were delivered between 1972 and 1974. The service ultimately operated a total of eight Alouette IIIs between 1963 and 2007; throughout much of this period, they were the only helicopters operated by the Corps. 

On 21 September 2007, the Alouette III was formally retired from the Irish Air Corps during a ceremony held at Baldonnel Aerodrome. During 44 years of successful service, the Irish Alouette III fleet amassed over 77,000 flying hours. As well as routine military missions, the aircraft undertook some 1,717 search-and-rescue missions, saving 542 lives and flew a further 2,882 air ambulance flights. The oldest of the Alouettes, 195, is kept in 'rotors running' condition for the Air Corps Museum.

India

Under a licensing arrangement between Aérospatiale and Indian aircraft manufacturer Hindustan Aeronautics Limited (HAL), the Alouette III has been built under licence by HAL in India. Known locally under the designation HAL Chetak, more than 300 rotorcraft have been manufactured to date; the majority of these were acquired for military purposes with the Indian Armed Forces, who have used them to perform various mission roles, including training, transport, CASEVAC (casualty evacuation), communications and liaison roles. By 2017, the Chetak was reportedly serving as the most widely used IAF helicopter for training, light utility and light attack roles.

During 1986, the Indian Government constituted the Army's Aviation Corps; consequently, the majority of Chetaks previously operated by AOP Squadrons were transferred from the Indian Air Force to the Indian Army on 1 November 1986. The Air Force has continued to fly a force of armed Chetaks in the anti-tank role as well as for CASEVAC missions and general duties. During the 2010s, the Chetak is being gradually replaced by the newer HAL Dhruv in the armed forces. An option to re-engine the HAL Chetak with the Turbomeca TM 333-2B engine, which would better facilitate high-altitude operations in the Himalayas was considered, but ultimately not pursued.

In addition to producing the type for Indian customers, HAL has also achieved some export sales of Chetak helicopters to several nations, including Namibia and Suriname. India has also opted to donate several secondhand Chetak helicopters to other countries, such as neighbouring Nepal. As of 2017, the Indian Navy has reportedly recognised the necessity of procuring a replacement for the type.

HAL Chetak was used in Operation Khukri which was a multinational operation launched in the United Nations Assistance Mission in Sierra Leone (UNAMSIL), involving India, Ghana, Britain and Nigeria
.

Beginning in the 1970s, during Republic Day parades, Chetak helicopters have been decorated to look like animals such as dodo birds, fish, and, most notably, elephants. The helicopters decorated like elephants have become iconic in India, and known as names such as "dancing elephant helicopters" and "flying elephants".

Pakistan
During the 1960s, Pakistan purchased a fleet of 35 Alouette III helicopters to equip the Pakistan Air Force (PAF). These saw active combat during the Indo-Pakistani War of 1971, in which the type was mainly used for liaison and VIP-transport missions. In 2010, it was announced that Switzerland had come to an agreement with Pakistan for a number of ex-Swiss Alouette IIIs to be donated to the PAF; however, the terms of this agreement restricts their usage to performing search and rescue and disaster relief operations.

Portugal

Portugal was the first country to use the Alouette III in combat. In 1963, during the Overseas Wars in Angola, Mozambique and Portuguese Guinea, Portugal began using Alouette IIIs in combat, mainly in air assault and medevac operations, where it proved its qualities. Besides the basic transport version (code named canibal, plural  canibais), Portugal used a special version of the Alouette III with a MG 151 20 mm autocannon mounted in the rear in order to fire from the left side door; it was designated helicanhão (heli-cannon) and code named lobo mau (big bad wolf).

In the Overseas Wars, the Portuguese usually launched air assaults with groups of six or seven Alouette III: five or six canibais – each usually carrying five paratroopers or commandos – and a lobo mau heli-cannon. The Portuguese practice was for the troops to jump from the canibais when the helicopters were hovering two-three metres above the ground – famous images of these disembarking troops became an iconic image of the war. The landing of the troops was covered by the lobo mau. While the troops performed the ground assault, the canibais moved away from the combat zone, while the lobo mau stayed to provide fire support, destroying enemy resistance and concentration points with the fire from its 20 mm autocannon. Once the ground combat had finished, the canibais returned; firstly to collect the wounded, then the rest of the troops.

The last SE3160 Alouette III light utility helicopters of Portugal were withdrawn from service in April 2020, being replaced by five AgustaWestland AW119 Koala.

Republic of Korea

In 1977, Republic of Korea Navy started operating 12 Alouette IIIs into service. It was dispatched in several destroyers as antisubmarine helicopters. On August 13, 1983, Republic of Korea Navy discovered a spy naval ship from Korean People's Army entering their sea. Alouette III engaged spy ship, and finally destroyed the ship with AS.12 missile. As a result, that specific helicopter received victory marking, which was the only aircraft received in the entire Republic of Korea Armed Forces. Alouette III also served as a rescue helicopter in 1993 when Asiana Airlines Flight 733 crashed in Mokpo, Republic of Korea. All Alouette III were relieved of its use in 2019.

Rhodesia
The nation of Rhodesia emerged as a prolific user of both the Alouette II and its enlarged sibling, the Alouette III. Early operations were flown with an emphasis on its use by the Rhodesian Army and British South Africa Police, including paramilitary and aerial reconnaissance operations. Throughout the 1960s, the type progressively spread into additional roles, including aerial supply, casualty evacuation, communications relays, and troop-transports. Rhodesian aerial operations would typically involve flying under relatively high and hot conditions, which reduced the efficiency of aircraft in general; however, the Alouette II proved to be both hardy and relatively resistant to battle damage. In order to extend the inadequate range of the type, fuel caches were strategically deployed across the country to be used for refuelling purposes.

At its peak, No. 7 Squadron of the Rhodesian Air Force operated a force of 34 Alouette IIIs, which would normally operate in conjunction with a smaller number of Alouette IIs. They played a major part in the Rhodesian Forces' Fireforce doctrine, in which they would rapidly deploy ground troops, function as aerial observation and command posts, and provide mobile fire support as armed gunships. In order to improve performance, Rhodesia's Alouette fleet was subject to extensive modifications during its service life, including changes to their refueling apparatus, gun sights, and cabin fittings, along with the installation of additional armouring and armaments.

Over time, the Rhodesian Security Forces developed an innovative deployment tactic of rapidly encircling and enveloping enemies, known as the Fireforce, for which the Alouette II was a core component. The quick-reaction Fireforce battalions were typically centred at Centenary and Mount Darwin; however, a deliberate emphasis was placed on locating both rotorcraft and troops as close to a current or anticipated theatre of operations as would be feasibly possible.

South Africa

The Alouette III served for over 44 years in the South African Air Force (SAAF); it is believed that 121 examples were acquired between 1962 and 1975 for the service from France. During 1966, by which point the SAAF had built up a fleet of around 50 Alouette IIIs already, it was decided to dispatch several of the type to support ground troops stationed in South West Africa attempting to contain the emerging South West African People's Organisation (SWAPO); this would be the beginnings of what would become the lengthy South African Border War. The type saw considerable action during the conflict; while initially used for more passive operations such as aerial reconnaissance, from July 1967 onwards, Alouette III participated in active combat missions as well. It was frequently employed as a support platform for performing South African counterstrike operations inside neighbouring Namibia and Angola. Reportedly, a total of eight Alouette IIIs had been listed as having been lost over the conflict zone by the end of the war.

By 1990, there were a total of 70 Alouette III helicopters remaining in active service. Throughout the course of its service life with the SAAF, the Alouette III fleet was recorded as having accumulated more than 346,000 flight hours. During June 2006, the last Alouette III was officially withdrawn from SAAF service at a ceremony held at AFB Swartkop, near Pretoria.

During January 2013, reports emerged that South African defense officials were in the process of planning to transfer some of the retired fleet, along with spare parts and associated support equipment, to the Zimbabwean Air Force; South African newspaper Mail & Guardian claimed that the rotorcraft could be used to sway politics in the nation in favour of the incumbent President, Robert Mugabe. However, during February 2013, an interim court order was issued which blocked the proposed sale of South African Alouette IIIs to Zimbabwe. In February 2014, reports emerged that South Africa now intended to sell part of the ex-SAAF fleet to Namibia instead.

Suriname
During 1986, the South American country of Suriname purchased a pair of secondhand Alouette III helicopters from Portugal. During 1999, the Surinam Air Force opted to retire and sell off its Alouette III helicopters. In their place, three newly built HAL Chetaks (an Indian version of the Alouette IIIs) were delivered to the Suriname Air Force on 13 March 2015, while the pilots and technicians of the Surinam Air Force underwent training on the type in Bangalore, India for some time.

Switzerland

During 1964, the Swiss Air Force opted to procure a batch of nine Alouette III rotorcraft directly from Aérospatiale; further orders included one placed in 1966 for 15 more. In addition, a total of 60 SA-316Bs (often referred to as the F+W Alouette IIIS) were licence-assembled by F+W Emmen in Switzerland.

During 2004, the Swiss Armed Forces announced the expected withdrawal of the Alouette III from front-line service would commence by 2006 and that it was to be entirely retired by 2010; they have been replaced by a smaller force of 20 new-built Eurocopter EC635s. Since their retirement, at least 10 ex-Swiss Alouettes have been gifted to Pakistan to perform search and rescue operations.

Variants
SE 3160 : the first production version. Sometimes retroactively redesignated SA 3160 or SA 316A.
The SA 316B was built under licence in India as the HAL Chetak, and again under licence in Romania as the IAR 316.
HAL Chetak : Indian production version of the SA 316B.
HAL Chetan : HAL/Turbomecca TM 333-2M2 Shakti engine.
IAR 316 : Romanian production version of the SA 316B.
 F+W Alouette IIIS : 60 SA-316B licence-assembled in Switzerland by F+W Emmen (de) between 1970 and 1974.
SA 319B (sometimes called "Alouette III Astazou") : developed from the SA 316B.
SA 316C : developed from the SA 316B. The SA 316C was only built in small numbers.
G-Car and K-Car : Helicopter gunship versions for the Rhodesian Air Force. The G-Car was armed with two side-mounted Browning .303 or a single 7.62mm MAG machine guns. The K-Car was armed with a 20 mm MG 151 cannon, fitted inside the cabin, firing from the port side of the helicopter.
SA.3164 Alouette-Canon: Modified in 1964 as a gunship version armed with a 20mm gun in the nose and external hardpoints for missiles mounted on each side of the fuselage. Only one prototype was built.
IAR 317 Airfox: A Romanian helicopter gunship project based on the IAR 316. Only three prototypes were ever built.
Atlas XH-1 Alpha: South African two-seat attack helicopter project. It was used in the development of the Denel Rooivalk.
K-1 'Chetak', informally- 'Frenchman': 8 HAL Chetaks were bought by the Soviet Union for testing purposes at Kacha airfield, Sevastopol, in 1985, and later 2 of them were used by DOSAAF from Karagoz airfield

Operators

Current military operators

 Angola Defence Force

 Austrian Air Force

 Bolivian Air Force

 Burundi National Army

 Chad Air Force

 Congo Democratic Air Force

 Eswatini Air Force

 Ethiopian Air Force

 French Navy

 Gabonese Air Force

 
 Hellenic Navy

 Indian Air Force
 Indian Army
 Indian Navy

 Indonesian Army

 Maltese Air Wing

Mauritius Police Force

 Namibian Air Force

 Pakistan Army
 Pakistan Navy

 
 Surinam Air Force

 Tunisian Air Force

 Air Force of Zimbabwe

Former military operators

 Abu Dhabi Air Wing

 Argentine Naval Aviation

 Belgian Air Component
 Belgian Naval Component

 Biafran armed forces

 Bangladesh Air Force

 Bophuthatswana Air Force

 Burma Air Force

 Cameroon Air Force

 Chilean Navy

 Royal Danish Navy 

 Dominican Air Force

 Ecuadorian Navy

 Air Force of El Salvador

 French Air Force 
 French Army 
 Sécurité Civile

 Ghana Air Force

 Guinean Air Force

Guinea-Bissau Air Force

Guyana Defence Force

 Hong Kong Auxiliary Air Force

 Iraq Air Force

 Irish Air Corps 

 Jordanian Air Force 

 Lebanese Air Force

 Libyan Air Force
 Libyan National Army

Royal Malaysian Air Force
Malaysian Army Aviation

 Malagasy Air Force 

 Malawi Army Air Wing 

 Mexican Air Force 
 Mexican Navy

 Royal Moroccan Gendarmerie 

 Mozambique Air Force

 Yemen Arab Republic Air Force

 Royal Netherlands Air Force

 Sandinista Air Force

 Pakistan Air Force

 Peruvian Air Force 
 Peruvian Army
 Peruvian Naval Aviation 

Portuguese Air Force

 Rhodesian Air Force

 Rwandan Defence Force

 Royal Saudi Air Force

 Seychelles Air Force

 Singapore Air Force 
 
 South African Air Force 

 Republic of Korea Naval Air Arm

 South Vietnamese Air Force 

 Spanish Air Force 
 Spanish Army 

 Swiss Air Force

 Upper Volta Air Force 

 Venezuelan Air Force

 Yugoslav Air Force

 Zaire Air Force

Former civilian operators

 Air – Transport Europe

Specifications (SA 316B)

See also

References

Notes

Citations

Bibliography
 
 Boyne, Walter. "How the Helicopter Changed Modern Warfare." Pelican Publishing, 2011. .
 Chant, Christopher. "A Compendium of Armaments and Military Hardware." Routledge, 2014. .
 Cocks, Kerrin. "Rhodesian Fire Force 1966–80." Helion, 2015. .
 Donald, David, ed. The Complete Encyclopedia of World Aircraft. New York: Barnes & Noble Books, 1997. .
 
 

 McGownen, Stanley. "Helicopters: An Illustrated History of Their Impact." ABC-CLIO, 2005. .
 Polmar, Norman and Floyd D. Kennedy. "Military helicopters of the world: military rotary-wing aircraft since 1917. Naval Institute Press, 1981. .
 Taylor, John W. R. Jane's All The World's Aircraft 1966–67. London: Sampson Low, Marston & Company, 1966.
 
 Upreti, Bhuwan Chandra. "Maoists in Nepal: From Insurgency to Political Mainstream." Gyan Publishing House, 2008. .

External links

 Aérospatiale SA 316B/ VSV/ SA 319B Alouette III
 GlobalSecurity.org SA 316/SA 319 Alouette III
 Sud Aviation SA 316/319 Alouette III
 The Virtual Aviation Museum – Aérospatiale SE 3160 Alouette III
 Hindustan Aeronautics Limited – Chetak
 

1950s French civil utility aircraft
1950s French military utility aircraft
1950s French helicopters
Aérospatiale aircraft
Single-turbine helicopters
Search and rescue helicopters
Aircraft first flown in 1959